Haplogroup K2b1a may refer to:
 a subclade of Haplogroup K (mtDNA)
 Haplogroup K2b1a (Y-DNA)